Idelson may refer to:

People with the surname Idelson:
 Beba Idelson (1895-1975), Israeli politician
 Benjamin Idelson (1911-1972), Israeli Architect
 Bill Idelson (1919-2007), American actor and scriptwriter
 Naum Idelson (1885–1951), Russian astronomer

Other:
 Idel'son (crater), lunar crater named after Naum Idelson

See also 
 Abraham Zevi Idelsohn (1882–1938), Jewish ethnologist

Jewish surnames
German-language surnames